The mountain fulvetta (Alcippe peracensis) is a  14 to 15.5 cm long species of bird in the Alcippeidae family. It is found in Cambodia, Laos, Malaysia, Thailand, and Vietnam in subtropical or tropical moist montane forests.

The black-browed fulvetta, Alcippe grotei, is sometimes considered to be conspecific with mountain fulvetta, but the two forms differ in morphology and vocalisations, and are separated altitudinally. Black-browed fulvetta occurs primarily below 400 m, and mountain fulvetta above 900 m.

Both have a warm brown back and tail, whitish underparts, a grey face and a slate grey crown bordered below with a black line, but black-browed has brown flanks and a weaker white eyering.

Mountain has a yi-yuii-uwee-uwee song, whereas black-browed's is yu-chi-chiwi-chuwoo, yu-uwit-ii-uwoo.

References

Collar, N. J. & Robson C. 2007. Family Timaliidae (Babblers)  pp. 70 – 291 in; del Hoyo, J., Elliott, A. & Christie, D.A. eds. Handbook of the Birds of the World, Vol. 12. Picathartes to Tits and Chickadees. Lynx Edicions, Barcelona.
Robson, Craig Birds of Thailand. 2002. Princeton University Press, .
Robson, Craig  A Field Guide to the Birds of Thailand, 2004 
Wildlife of Lao PDR: 1999 Status Report

mountain fulvetta
Birds of Laos
Birds of Vietnam
Birds of the Malay Peninsula
mountain fulvetta
Taxonomy articles created by Polbot